Bharat Singh  was a Member of Parliament, Lok Sabha from the Ballia (Lok Sabha constituency). He is member of the Bharatiya Janata Party. He won the 2014 Indian general elections from the Ballia Lok Sabha constituency by defeating former Prime Minister Chandra Shekhar's son Neeraj Shekhar with a margin of 1,39,434 votes.

Early life
Bharat Singh was born on 15 September 1948 in village Navka Tola in Bairiya tehsil of Ballia district in Uttar Pradesh. His late father Ramcheej Singh was a simple farmer. Bharat Singh got his early education at his native village and went on to complete his graduation from Jodhpur University, Rajasthan in 1973. Bharat Singh entered in politics when he was a student of Banaras Hindu University. He got elected as President of Banaras Hindu University Students' Union in the year 1978.

Political career
Bharat Singh successfully contested Uttar Pradesh Assembly elections of 1991, 1996 and 2002 from Bairiya assembly seat in Ballia. He served three terms as Member of Legislative Assembly (MLA). However he contested the Lok Sabha election of 2014 from Ballia as Bharatiya Janata Party Candidate and defeated the seating MP Neeraj Shekhar.

Posts Held
General Secretary of Banaras Hindu University Students' Union, 1975
President of Banaras Hindu University Students' Union, 1978
Member of Legislative Assembly (MLA), Uttar Pradesh, 1991
Member of Legislative Assembly (MLA), Uttar Pradesh, 1996
Member of Legislative Assembly (MLA), Uttar Pradesh, 2002
Member of Parliament, Lok Sabha, Ballia (Lok Sabha constituency), 2014

References

Living people
India MPs 2014–2019
People from Ballia district
Lok Sabha members from Uttar Pradesh
Bharatiya Janata Party politicians from Uttar Pradesh
1948 births